Events in the year 1904 in Japan.

Incumbents
Emperor: Emperor Meiji
Prime Minister: Katsura Tarō

Governors
Aichi Prefecture: Masaaki Nomura
Akita Prefecture: Ichiro Tsubaki then Oka Kishichiro Itami
Aomori Prefecture: Ichiji Yamanouchi then Katsutaro Inuzuka then Shotaro Nishizawa
Ehime Prefecture: Tai Neijro then Makoto Sugai then Kensuke Ando
Fukui Prefecture: Suke Sakamoto
Fukushima Prefecture: Arita Yoshisuke
Gifu Prefecture: Kawaji Toshikyo
Gunma Prefecture: Yoshimi Teru
Hiroshima Prefecture: Tokuhisa Tsunenori then Yamada Haruzo
Ibaraki Prefecture: Teru Terahara
Iwate Prefecture: Ganri Hojo then Sokkichi Oshikawa
Kagawa Prefecture: Motohiro Onoda
Kochi Prefecture: Munakata Tadashi
Kumamoto Prefecture: Egi Kazuyuki
Kyoto Prefecture: Baron Shoichi Omori
Mie Prefecture: Kamon Furusha then Lord Arimitsu Hideyoshi
Miyagi Prefecture: Terumi Tanabe
Miyazaki Prefecture: Toda Tsunetaro 
Nagano Prefecture: Seki Kiyohide  
Niigata Prefecture: Hiroshi Abe
Oita Prefecture: Marques Okubo Toshi Takeshi then Shuichi Kinoshita then Ogura Hisashi
Okinawa Prefecture: Shigeru Narahara
Saga Prefecture: Seki Kiyohide
Saitama Prefecture: Count Jissho Oogimachi then Marquis Okubo Toshi Takeshi
Shiga Prefecture: Sada Suzuki
Shiname Prefecture: Ihara Ko then Matsunaga Takeyoshi
Tochigi Prefecture: Kubota Kiyochika 
Tokushima Prefecture: Saburo Iwao
Tokyo: Baron Sangay Takatomi
Toyama Prefecture: Rika Ryusuke
Yamagata Prefecture: Tanaka Takamichi 
Yamanashi Prefecture: Takeda Chiyosaburo

Events
February 8–9 – Battle of Port Arthur: A surprise Japanese naval attack on Port Arthur (Lüshun) in Manchuria starts the Russo-Japanese War.
February 9 – Battle of Chemulpo Bay
February 23 – Japan–Korea Treaty of 1904
April 30–May 1 – Battle of Yalu River (1904)
May 25–26 – Battle of Nanshan
June 14–15 – Battle of Te-li-Ssu
July 10 – Battle of Motien Pass
July 24–25 – Battle of Tashihchiao
July 31 – Battle of Hsimucheng
August 10 – Battle of the Yellow Sea
August 14 – Battle off Ulsan
August 20 – Battle of Korsakov
August 22 – Japan–Korea Agreement of August 1904
August 24–September 4 –  Battle of Liaoyang
October 5–17 – Battle of Shaho
Unknown date – Hirano Rubber Manufacturing, as predecessor of Toyo Tire was founded.

Births
February 9 – Kikuko Kawakami, author (d. 1985)
May 27 – Chūhei Nambu, track and field athlete (d. 1997)
June 1 – Ineko Sata, communist and feminist author of proletarian literature (d. 1998)
July 18 – Fuji Yahiro, screenwriter (d. 1986)
July 25 – Katsuji Matsumoto, illustrator (d. 1986)
August 7 – Taro Takemi, physician and 11th President of the Japan Medical Association (d. 1983)
August 16 – Minoru Genda, military aviator and politician (d. 1989)
September 1 – Aya Kōda, essayist and novelist (d. 1990)
October 11 – Ken'ichi Enomoto, comedian and singer (d. 1970)
November 18 – Masao Koga, composer (d. 1978)
November 22 – Fumio Niwa, novelist (d. 2005)
December 28 – Tatsuo Hori, writer, poet and translator (d. 1953)

Deaths
January 1 – Konoe Atsumaro, politician and journalist (b. 1863)
January 9 – Ii Naonori, former daimyō, son of Ii Naosuke (b. 1848)
February 6 – Utagawa Yoshiiku, artist (b. 1833)
March 27 – Takeo Hirose, navy career officer (b. 1868)
August 12 – Kawamura Sumiyoshi, admiral (b. 1836)
August 31 – Tachibana Shūta, soldier (b. 1865)
September 26 – Koizumi Yakumo, writer (b. 1850)

References

 
1900s in Japan
Japan